Faleniu is a village in the west of Tutuila Island, American Samoa. It is located inland from the village of Tafuna, in Tuālāuta County.

Its name translates to “the home in the palm grove.”

As of 2010, Faleniu had a 61.7 percent high school graduation rate, which was the lowest of any village in American Samoa. Also in 2010, Faleniu was the most densely-populated village in American Samoa (it had a population density of 7,741.2 people per square mile).

Demographics

References

Villages in American Samoa